Anastasios Tagis (1839–1900) was a Greek scholar and philological teacher of the 19th century.

Biography 
Tagis was born in Monodendri of Ioannina in 1839. He graduated from the Rizarios School of Athens and later from the Philolological School of the University of Athens where he was awarded the teacher of philology degree. He initially taught in the Gymnasium of Samos, after in Crete and then in Halki. In 1873, he founded, along with others, a Greek high school in Pera of Constantinople (officially Konstaniniyye) and taught in it with his brother, Filippos. Later, in 1869, he was elected a member of the Greek Philological Society of Constantinople (Ελληνικός Φιλολογικός Σύλλογος εν Κωνσταντινούπολει). He also taught in the Vasmatzidis School of Pera and in the famous Zografeion Lyceum.

He wrote interpretations of the Aristotelian definitions of tragedy, elegies, pindar odes and commented on Xenophon and the myths of Aesop. He spoke the Ancient Greek language fluently and completed a Delphic Hymn in 1894.

He died in 1900, at the age of 60 or 61.

References 
Footnotes

Sources
Jiovas Frixos, "Κατάλογος Συγγραφέων Περιοχής Ζαγορίου (Από τον Μεθόδιο Ανθρακίτη έως σήμερα)" [List of writers of the region of Zagori (From Methodios Anthrakites to today)], Ioannina, publ. Το Ζαγόρι μας, 1990, p. 64

1839 births
1900 deaths
Greek scholars
Greek schoolteachers
Greek philologists
National and Kapodistrian University of Athens alumni
People from Zagori